The president of the Ateneo de Manila University ( Spanish: Presidente de Universidad Ateneo de Manila; Latin: Praeside Universitas Athenaea Manilensis) is the chief administrator and principal executive officer of the Ateneo de Manila University. The president is directly chosen by the university's Board of Trustees. Thirty people have held the office, in addition to several others who have held it in either an acting or interim capacity. In all cases where the president of the Ateneo de Manila University is unable to fulfill their duties, an appointed officer in charge (OIC) will become acting president.

Roberto Yap is the 31st and current president of the Ateneo de Manila University. He assumed office on August 1, 2020.

List of presidents of the Ateneo de Manila University

See also 

 List of colleges and universities in Metro Manila
 List of Jesuit educational institutions in the Philippines
 Ateneo de Manila University

References

External links 

 Ateneo de Manila University Official Website

Ateneo de Manila University